Haiti has vaccinated around 123k people as of May 2022, having a 1.1% vaccination rate. The Haitian government is yet to accept the free Oxford–AstraZeneca COVID-19 vaccines offered by U.N backed COVAX due to safety and logistical concerns. The U.S. government has said that it would donate a portion of its six million doses for Haiti.

References

Vaccination
Haiti